Quincy Butler (born September 1, 2001) is an American soccer player who plays for German club Hoffenheim II.

Career 
On August 18, 2017, Butler signed for United Soccer League club Sacramento Republic as an amateur player after impressing in their academy side. He made his debut for the club on July 10, 2018, as an injury-time substitute during a 3-1 win over Swope Park Rangers.

In the summer of 2019, Butler moved to Bundesliga side TSG 1899 Hoffenheim, initially with their under-19 squad.

References 

2001 births
Soccer players from Sacramento, California
Living people
American soccer players
Association football forwards
Sacramento Republic FC players
TSG 1899 Hoffenheim II players
USL Championship players
Regionalliga players
American expatriate soccer players
American expatriate soccer players in Germany